This is a list of Legendz characters from the Japanese multi-media franchise.

Characters in the anime

Humans

 
 He's the "Kaze no Saga" or "Saga of Wind". A very absent-minded, irresponsible 11-year-old boy who loves baseball (which he's bad at) and cute girls (which upsets Meg greatly). Shu seems to be an unlikely hero but proves his worth in the later episodes. His Legendz is Shiron the Windragon.

 
 She's the "Mizu no Saga" or "Saga of Water". A pink-haired girl who is a friend of Shu. Her Legendz is Zuou the Bigfoot. Originally, she was comfortable with the idea of Legendz existing (normally Shiron hanging around with the kids) but as the series progresses, Meg begins to develop an intense dislike of them and fighting, because she feels that those are ruining the normal life she and her friends once had; she also admits to Legendz being physically frightening. She has a tendency to take pictures of people and things. Her most noteworthy trait is that she possesses a great deal of common sense among the three friends. As an intended running gag throughout the anime, whenever Shu does something that irritates Meg to the limit of her patience, she delivers her "Meg Chop" to Shu's head (in one case, she has used the chop on the Maze Octopus "Rapper King").

 
 The "Saga of Earth". An obese boy who likes hamburgers and is a very perceptive friend of Shu and of most situations the group gets into. His Legendz is Garion the Griffin. Mac is very kind and isn't particularly upset by anything. He possesses a verbal tic that has him say "you know" at the end of nearly every sentence.

 
 
 The "Saga of Fire". A rich, but lonely boy who always carries a rose with him. His Legendz is Greedo the Blazedragon. Despite his status as a wealthy person, he is not arrogant or looks down on others as most stereotypical upper class are portrayed. He is very bitter towards his father and accuses of him of being the reason his mother left.

 
 
 A 25-year-old woman who has a life-long interest in all Legendz. She also fronts as a teacher at Shu's school. Her life is deeply entwined with Legendz more than she knows. She is particularly infatuated with Shiron, whom she flips out around every time he appears. At one point, she professes she is in love with Shiron. She spends a lot of her time researching her father's old books, where she discovers some startling and dark secrets about Legendz. Later in the anime (around episode 20) she joins forces with Ranshiin trying to stop the children (the sagas) and their legendz from being together.

BB/Bouchou 
 
 A purple-haired woman sent to retrieve the Wind Talispod from Shu. Though she works hard to steal it from him, she is not an unkind person as seen later on. She eventually comes to question the methods of DWC and quits, along with J1 and J2. Her actual name is Bunny Brookmeyer, as revealed in Episode 46.

J1 and J2 
 Voiced by: Eiji Takemoto (J1) and Tsuyoshi Maeda (J2)
 Two agents who work under BB. They are referred to as J1 and J2 as they have the same name "Jack Johnson".

President of DWC 
 
 A small, pitiful man who "controls" DWC in place of the CEO. He is constantly bullied and intimidated by Ranshiin in just about every episode they are together, most often due to either Ranshiin being unhappy with the electric fans he uses to air himself or because of the constant failures to retrieve Shu's Talispod.

 
 
 Shu's dad who works at DWC. He gives Shu the Wind Talispod. A seemingly typical Japanese father who just wants his son to be happy.

 
 
 Shu's mother. Despite a seemingly minor role in the anime, her involvement in the story becomes deeper toward the end after getting hit by Jabberwock's dark crystal and crystalizes, much to Shu's shock and regret. However later she returns to normal after Jabberwock's defeat. Much like Shu's father, she simply wants Shu to be happy with things.

 
 
 Dino's father, who was the president of the Duck Mind Company. He and Sasuke develop the Talisdam, an upgrade of the Talispod, with three Soul Doll docking bays.

Legendz

 
 A wind-type Legendz who can't remember his past. His attack is "Wing Tornado". The main Legendz character. He is fond of windy days and is actually quite social, despite the fact he spends a great deal of his time in his lesser form, a hamster-like animal (nicknamed "Nezuccho" or 'ねずっちょ') that can't say anything beyond that of "ga ga ga." During parts of episodes, Shiron's form is also mistaken for a "white mouse" or "white mouse with wings". Shuu's Legendz.

 
 
 A fire-type Legendz, he transforms into a rose which Dino takes around with him. Greedo is part of a three-Legendz team called G-W-Nicole. Despite his rebel appearance and tough personality he slowly grows to befriend Dino and is actually quite friendly. He is a stark contrast to Dino in many ways. It is eventually revealed that he had lost his previous Saga in the past because of Killbeat the Bicorn, and as such does not want to endanger the life of another soul he believes he won't be able to protect, causing him to push Dino away for a time.

 
 
 Earth-type Legendz. A member of Greedo's group, G-W-Nicole.

 
 
 Wind-type Legendz. A member of Greedo's group, G-W-Nicole.

 
 
 An earth-type Legendz. Wise and powerful, frightening when provoked, she can be set in her ways. She was sealed away inside her saga's body. Mac's Legendz.

 
 
 A water-type Legendz (though his attacks actually consist of ice and snow). He is young and naïve, but cares for Meg and will protect her at all costs, despite Meg's initial desire for him to stay away from her. Meg's Legendz.

 
 
 A mysterious black-winged Windragon who seems to be the one in true control of DWC (he bullies and intimidates the President of the company constantly) and has an interest in Shiron as he is very similar to him. Shiron isn't as bad-hearted or superior in every way as Ranshiin is and loses every fight with him. He is malevolent, aggressive, black-hearted, psychopathic, and spends his time harassing, teasing, and bullying the president of DWC or Shiron. He seems to be rather easily annoyed by the lack of wind where he's staying and uses electrical fans often. Ranshiin is physically and mentally an antithesis to Shiron in every way. The idea of him being such a mysterious character stems from the fact that his bio always appears as a series of question marks in the opening theme. In addition, it seems he is prone to small fits of insanity. Towards the end of the show, it is revealed that he and Shiron are actually two halves of the same Windragon. It is also shown at the end of the series that he, like Shiron, also has a lesser, hamster-like form. Ranshiin was killed when Jacob A Baran and his Chevralkin and his God Warrior legendz took away his poweres with their Chevralkins. Stabbed his heart, and caused him to melt, leaving nothing but his attire and his soul absorbed. (nicknamed "Waruccho" or 'わるっちょ').

Minor/miscellaneous characters in the anime

Goblin 
 Summoned by BB to attack Shu in the first episode so he will surrender the wind talispod. While at DWC, he seems to be a file clerk.

Big Goblin 
 Formed by multiple goblins merging, Shiron's 1st opponent.

Storm Worm 
 Shiron's 2nd opponent. Does not put up much of a fight.

Giant Crab 
 Shiron's 3rd opponent. It only really wants to return to the sea.

Dandy the Devour Crocodile 
 First appears in episode 4. A water-type Legendz who is hired by DWC to negotiate with Shu for his Talispod, but is reformed and does good deeds. He calls Shiron his "aniki", which means "older brother" among yakuza. Later in the series, Dandy opens up a bar for Legendz to hang out at called "Cafe Wani no Ana", meaning "Crocodile Cave Cafe". He snaps at people when he is called a crocodile. He apparently knows Salamander, as he mentions him by name in episode 4, but exactly how they met is unknown (their friendship is unusual in that they are both opposite elements). Voice Actor: Kouji Ishii

Anna the Harpy 
 First appears in episode 5. A caring, free-spirited wind-type Legendz who disguises herself as a young girl to steal Shu's Talispod. However, she realizes that she cares for Shu. She manages to preserve her consciousness and does not participate in Legendz War, because Dandy protected her from the wind. Anna also convinces Shu to save his friends during Jabberwock's awakening and takes care of his mother while he saves his friends.

Fire Giant 
 He belongs to Ed, the self proclaimed Fire Saga. Though he knows Ed isn't very reliable, he supports him as best he can. In later episode, Fire Giant gains his consciousness back because of Ed and escapes the fate of participating in Legendz War.

Cait Sith 
 An intelligent cat Legendz working for DWC. However, his weakness is that he can behave very much like an ordinary cat (chasing mice, lying in sunlight, etc.) though that was due to Shu's constant attempts at proving he was literally a cat. Later episodes, he is one of the Legendz who does not participate in Legendz War (he says that this is because he is bad at fighting). He is seen helping the parents of the Sagas and the other Legendz.

Hellhounds 
 Five dog Legendz that combine into one. They greatly endangered Meg's life.

Rapper King the Maze Octopus 
 A water-type Legendz who has more of a desire to sing instead of fight. Despite his name, what he sings can't be considered rap.

Willowisp 
 Fire Legendz, used as a distraction to get Shiron's attention (the target at that time wasn't Shu's talispod, instead the target is Mac).

Chimera 
 Shape shifting Legendz, one of Shiron's first difficult opponents. This legendz can split into fiery forms of a goat, lion, eagle, and a snake.

Kraken 
 Water Legendz, attacks Shiron when he goes off on his own.

Zombie 
 Dark Legendz, able to reform no matter their damage.

Skeleton 
 Sent by Ranshiin to test Shiron, he summons zombies to fight him. He is actually quite irritating and more of a nuisance than anything due to his exasperating tone of voice. He escapes the fate of participating the Legendz War as he is sleeping in the sewer, avoiding the wind. He helps the parents of the Sagas and other remaining Legendz.

Golem
 Earth Legendz.

Assassin Bug
 Wind Legendz.

Gargoyle 
 A powerful dark Legendz summoned by Skeleton to deal with Shiron.

Bicorn 
 A dark unicorn Legendz who goes by the name "Kirubito" (Killbeat), she delights in the suffering of others. Her strongest ability is making anyone relive their worst fear, which she particularly enjoyed subjecting Greedo to.

Lesser Gargoyle 
 Summoned by Bicorn to cause panic amongst the people.

Yeti 
 Ice-Type Legendz similar to Zuou who happened to interrupt a baseball game and fights Zuou. He is difficult for a few minutes but then Zuou suddenly transforms to his second form and takes Yeti down.

Salamander 
 Appears in episode 20 disguised as a hotdog vendor at Coney Island. A fire-type Legendz summoned by BB to capture Shu's talipod, but fails. A few episodes later, he reunites with Dandy and works at his bar, "Cafe Wani no Ana". Voice Actor: Eiji Takemoto

Jin 
 A wind-type Legendz that tries to steal Shiron's cap, summons Cloud Giant when he is outmatched.

Cloud Giant 
 An extremely gigantic wind-type Legendz summoned by Jin to fight Shiron after stealing Shiron's cap. He is so huge, his head literally could be in the clouds.

Dwarf
 Earth Legendz.

Vampire 
 Dark Legendz, summoned by Halca and Ranshiin to take Shiron down, also fights and loses to Garion.

Hydra
 Water Legendz, this monster appeared in the Legendz War, he has nine heads spewing bursts of acid.

Trolls
 Earth Legendz.

Minotaur 
 Earth Legendz.

Rock Birds
 Wind Legendz. One of them helps Halca to destroy Jabberwock's dark talispod after it is freed from the influence of the Jabberwock's dark crystal.

Mr. English (Eigo A-ta) 
 A strange carrot-nosed character who randomly appears in the show and speaks in English. Eigo assumes the role of narrator, though it is not consistent narration.

Ms. General Affairs (Soumu-san) 
 A polite-speaking employee of DWC who appears randomly to assist BB.

Perkins 
 An absentminded scientist working for DWC.

Richard/Robert/Steve 
 A strange little man, who is constantly changing his name and hunting profession.

Ed 
 The self proclaimed Fire Saga, but he is actually a timid man with few talents.

Meg's parents 
 Meg's mother and father, who have a small role in the anime. They are concerned for their daughter's happiness, but they know Meg makes the right choices.

Mac's parents 
 Mac's mother and father, who have relatively minor roles in the anime despite their concern for their son. Mac's father seems to be a pottery maker.

Important storyline characters in the anime

Selba 
  Greedo's past Saga, who was killed by Greedo's archrival Killbeat, a bicorn.
Tornado Elemental Legion (Blue) 
 Fusion of Shiron, Zuou, and Garion

Volcano Elemental Legion (Red) 
 Fusion of Greedo, Wolfie, and Leon

Spiritual Elemental Legion (Gold)
 Fusion of Shiron, Garion, and Greedo

CEO of DWC 
 As his name implies, he is the one who pulls all the strings at DWC (he wields more authority than Ranshiin). His entrance into the series is late, but his role is one of the most important.

Tornado King Dragon 
 One of the four Dragon Kings. Governs all wind-type Legendz

Storm King Dragon 
 One of the four Dragon Kings. Governs all water-type Legendz

Volcano King Dragon
 One of the four Dragon Kings. Governs all fire-type Legendz

Earthquake King Dragon 
 One of the four Dragon Kings. Governs all earth-type Legendz

Jabberwock 
 A terrifying gigantic Legendz who is rightfully feared by those who have heard of him. He wields the power to manipulate both humans and Legendz.

The Legendz gods 
 Mysterious divine Legendz that appear near the end of the series, their only interest is in speaking to Shiron. The leader of these gods (a being cloaked in bright light so you can't make out his face) tends to go off subject and the others interrupt him before he goes off on a tangent, or interrupt him if he tries to explain a relevant subject that they know will likely not be understood by the one he's speaking to. An example of this is when he tried to explain the purpose of the Legendz War to Shiron, the others interrupted and explained they've tried telling that to multiple other Legendz before, but the point always flew over their heads.
Wind-Maker?/Kanerudo Windragon 
 An incredibly powerful Legendz of "legend" who had the power to wield all the elements. He was once the general of the army of Legendz and the heir to the throne of Tornado King Dragon. He nearly brought the world to ruin long ago and has not been heard from since, becoming no more than a legend. He is depicted in the removed and hidden final pages of the "Book of Legendz", along with many pages worth of undeciphered text.  He is later revealed to be Shiron himself when he and Ranshiin combine as one.

Characters in the manga

 
 A normally aloof kid who takes Legendz seriously. He is the Wind Saga. He's really been influenced by Eiji Yashiro, after he had been beaten twice by him and ruthlessly pressed Shiron into training. Ken has a way of forcing others to drink his green tonic (that his grandmother made) for him; once his grandmother accidentally stuffed it down Yuki's throat, and he had pushed Shiron into doing so.

 A girl talented at Legendz who has a Mermaid Tetty. She is the Saga of Water.  The Water Saga's greatest gift is one of healing, which she used to the maximum when driven to do so.  She likes Ken, and was shocked when learned that he was going to America.

 
 The champion of the previous year's Legendz Carnival. His Legendz is a Dwarf named Kotaro. When Ken was in third grade, Eiji taught him to respect his Legendz because they are alive. He moved to America shortly after that.  He liked to flick Ken's forehead and grin, "I sure like your forehead."

 
 A boy who loses to Ririko every time despite all of his research on the game.
When Ririko makes it to the finals of a school Legendz tournament, he takes out a case filled with many talispods, showing that he may raise numerous Legends at one time.

 The school bully who thinks that he is the best at Legendz. Hosuke has a Troll named Banriki. He wants the Golden Soul Figure.  He even tried cheating in the school Legendz tournament to acquire it.  He was in the Ryudo Elementary Four, but it is unknown if he was kicked out.  Ken calls him "troll."

 
 Hosuke's younger brother, who wants to win at Legendz. However, his neglection of his Werewolf Balthus prevents his victory.  When Balthus is driven to attack him and Hosuke, Shunsuke refuses to attack back and instead defends himself and Hosuke, remarking that "Balthus is my best friend."  Yet, later on, he loses to Tetty and Ririko.

 
 The son of the president of DWC. He runs this year's Legendz Carnival competition. His Legendz is the Blazedragon Greedo. Leo is one of the two Fire Sagas.  He had red eyes and fire came out of his hands, and had no friends as a child but his sister.

 
 A contestant in the Legendz Carnival. She is the daughter of a Legendz researcher looking for crystals (her character background is very similar to Haruka's in the anime). Her Legendz is Bjork the Golem. She is the Earth Saga.  Ken calls her "Miss Underwear," because in the Legendz Carnival, she wore bloomers that Ken thought at first were underwear.

 / Namio Curly 
 Leo's assistant. His most prominent feature is his large Afro-style wig. He loves wigs, and tries them on when alone. He's even shown trying on a camo-styled wig. He's been with Leo a while.

 
 Leo's older twin sister. Mio was kidnapped by Necrom, the Dark Kingdom. Mio is the other Fire Saga.  She occasionally pulls on Leo's face, and once made him promise that he would be strong.

 
 Meiko is a sixth grader at Kokuryu Elementary School and is Hosuke's self-proclaimed girlfriend. Meiko kidnaps Ririko to lure Ken to the school. Then she battles Ken with her Assassin Bug, Baiks (and loses, too).

 A sixth grader at Ken's school. Yuki offers Ken his Golden Soul Figure if Ken proves himself as worthy of the soul figure. Ken's reply?  He stuffed it into Yuki's mouth.  He is the leader of the Ryudo Four and wields the Yeti Gosetsu.

 
 Another sixth grader who has a Kansai dialect. She is a member of the Ryudo Four. Her Legendz is Suzu, a Catsy. Both of them love meat buns.

 Ken's rather eccentric grandmother.  She makes green tonic (which Ken really hates).  She also tells fortunes and somehow drove across the Pacific Ocean from Japan to America.

 Jabberwock is the Lord of Necrom, summoned by Skeleton Lord Lich. He was incompletely resurrected; only the power of the Water Saga and some of the Fire Saga was used in his resurrection by Lich.

 A soft-spoken member of the Ryudo Four. His Legendz, Sofia, is a Cloud Giant.

Legendz types of the manga

 Windragon -  Known owner: Ken Kazaki
A powerful wind element dragon.

 Fire Giant - Known owner: Taizo "Hentai" Henmi
A large fire element golem.

 Troll - Known owner: Hosuke Dekai
The most powerful earth element Legendz up to date. It has amazing raw strength and lethal 1 hit kills.

 Mermaid - Known owner: Ririko Yasuhara
A water element Legendz with healing abilities and very low HP.

 Werewolf - Known owner: Shunsuke Dekai
Quick and stealthy earth element Legendz. It has a very fast long  ranged attack that can be used consecutively for great damage.

 Yeti - Known owner: Yuki Amagi
Large water element Legendz that focuses on ice attacks. Proficient  at counterattacks and regeneration.

 Black Hound - Known owners: Kokuryu Elementary Blackhounds (employed by Hosuke Dekai)
Fire element dog-like Legendz that usually attack in packs although alone they are very weak.

 Dwarf - Known owner: Eiji Yashiro
Small earth element Legendz with low HP and defense.

 Assassin Bug - Known owner: Meiko Kajiwara
A large wind element bee Legendz. Very speedy with long range poisonous attacks.

 Catsy - Known owner: Maki Mitsui
Freakishly large earth element cat. It likes meat and doesn't like to fight.

 Giant Crab - Known owner: Kogao Kino
Strong water element crab. Large and has regeneration abilities, but incredibly slow.

 Triton - Known owner: Goh Tokudaiji
Very agile water element "lord of the water". Can manipulate water however they desire, and are very powerful around bodies of water.

Terminology 

Sagas
The name for the destined children who possess the power to invoke and revert their Legendz via their Soul Dolls.

Soul Doll
Pieces of crystals in which the Legendz are sealed in, and could be resurrected by using the Talispods. In the manga, it is called 'soul figures' and are pieces of data. In the anime they are all real.

Talispods
Gadgets that are used to resurrect the Legendz inside the Soul Dolls. In the manga, they are mostly toys. In the anime, except purple Talispods that are sold in the toy store, Bouchou's purple Talispod, the four Saga's and Yul Hepburn's Talispod of Darkness, are all real Talispods.

Talisdam
Made by Sasuke Matsutani and Bruno Sparks, Talisdams have three Soul Doll docking bays and are able to create the Elemental Legions (Red, Blue, Gold). The idea is first mentioned in episode 16, when Bruno decided to make his own Talispod to cheer Dino up, he thought up the idea to merge three Talispods together. The first one was made in episode 24, where Greedo, Wolfy and Leon lived in it. The first succeeded in episode 26. The second appeared in episode 31, when the Talisdam was finished and somehow flew to Shu itself. The third appeared in episode 43, and was eventually used in episode 49.

References 

Lists of anime and manga characters